The 1955 Memorial Cup final was the 37th junior ice hockey championship of the Canadian Amateur Hockey Association. The George Richardson Memorial Trophy champions Toronto Marlboros of the Ontario Hockey Association in Eastern Canada competed against the Abbott Cup champions Regina Pats of the Western Canada Junior Hockey League in Western Canada. In a best-of-seven series, held at Regina Exhibition Stadium in Regina, Saskatchewan, Toronto won their 2nd Memorial Cup, and first since 1929 by defeating Regina 4 games to 1.

Scores
Game 1: Regina 3-1 Toronto
Game 2: Toronto 5-2 Regina
Game 3: Toronto 3-2 Regina
Game 4: Toronto 3-2 Regina (OT)
Game 5: Toronto 8-5 Regina

Winning roster
John Albani, Gary Aldcorn, Bobby Baun, Ron Casey, Gary Collins, Glenn Cressman, Bob Dodds, Ken Girard, Billy Harris, Gerry James, Ron Kendall, Bill Kennedy, Al MacNeil, Mike Nykoluk, Gord Onotsky, Bob Pulford, Jake Smola, Ross Sneddon.  Coach: Turk Broda

References

External links
 Memorial Cup 
 Canadian Hockey League

1954–55 in Canadian ice hockey
Memorial Cup tournaments
Ice hockey competitions in Regina, Saskatchewan
1955 in Saskatchewan